Bakrie University ( or informally ) is a private university in Jakarta, Indonesia, founded in 2009. It is located in Rasuna Epicentrum Jl. HR Rasuna Said Kav C-22, Kuningan, South Jakarta.

The university was established by the Yayasan Pendidikan Bakrie (Bakrie Education Foundation). In April 2011, ground was broken for a new campus at Bogor Nirwana Residence.

Programs

Undergraduate  
 Management (Accreditation B)
 Accounting (Accreditation A)
 Communication studies (Accreditation A)
 Informatics (Accreditation B)
 Information system (Accreditation B)
 Political science (Accreditation A)
 Industrial engineering (Accreditation B)
 Civil engineering (Accreditation A)
 Environmental engineering (Accreditation B)
 Food science and technology (Accreditation B)
 Business (double degree with Central Queensland University)
 Digital media (double degree with Central Queensland University)
 Arts (public relations) (double degree with Central Queensland University)
 Information Technology (Cyber Security)(double degree with Central Queensland University)

Postgraduate 
 Master of Management (Accreditation A)
 Master of Communication Science
 Master of Business Administration (double degree with Central Queensland University)

Rankings

In the Times Higher Education Impact Rankings 2022, Bakrie University is ranked in the range of 801–1000 globally, in terms of commitment towards United Nations’ Sustainable Development Goals (SDGs), where Bakrie University ranked 101-200 for Climate Action (1st among Indonesian universities), 401-600 for Quality Education (5th among Indonesian universities), 201-300 for Zero Hunger (8th among Indonesian universities), 301-400 for Responsible Consumption & Production (8th among Indonesian universities), 401-600 for Peace, Justice & Strong Institutions (9th among Indonesian universities), 601+ for Reduced Inequalities (10th among Indonesian universities), ranking Bakrie University as 15th overall and 3rd for private universities in Indonesia and 1st for private universities in Jakarta. Bakrie University is also featured in THE World University Rankings 2022, THE Asia University Rankings 2022, THE Young University Rankings 2022, THE Emerging Economies University Rankings 2022, Round University Ranking (RUR) World University Rankings 2022, U-Multirank World University Rankings 2022, and UI Greenmetric World University Rankings 2021.

International partnerships

As well as a dual degree MM-MBA partnership between Bakrie University and Central Queensland University, Australia, the two universities offer double degree undergraduate study programs in Jakarta. Bakrie University and Universiti Utara Malaysia (UUM) have a student mobility program, joint research through cross funding program and fast-track program to obtain a master's degree from UUM through a 3.5-year program at Bakrie University then continue one year at UUM.

Bakrie University has collaborations with several international institutions worldwide including:

 Stanford University, United States
 Tohoku University, Japan
 Aarhus University, Denmark
 Central Queensland University, Australia
 Tampere University of Technology, Finland
 Transilvania University of Brașov, Romania
 Caucasus University, Georgia
 Universiti Utara Malaysia, Malaysia
 Nihon University, Japan
 MARA University of Technology, Malaysia
 Higher School of Economics, Russia
 Tun Hussein Onn University of Malaysia, Malaysia
 Ritsumeikan University, Japan
 National University of Kaohsiung, Taiwan
 Rajamangala University of Technology, Thailand
 University of Zagreb, Croatia
 Osaka Institute of Technology, Japan
 National Formosa University, Taiwan
 Northern Virginia Community College, United States
 Chemeketa Community College, United States

References

External links
 Bakrie University English-language homepage
 QS Top Universities webpage
 double degree Bachelor of Arts Program Bakrie University/Central Queensland University
 double degree Bachelor of Business Program Bakrie University/Central Queensland University
 double degree Bachelor of Digital Media Program Bakrie University/Central Queensland University

Bakrie Group
Universities in Indonesia
Educational institutions established in 2009
Universities in Jakarta
Private universities and colleges in Jakarta
2009 establishments in Indonesia